Maljković is a South Slavic surname. Notable people with the surname include:

 Božidar Maljković, Serbian basketball coach
 Marina Maljković, Serbian basketball coach
 Vladimir Maljković, Croatian football player
 Nebojsa S. Maljkovic, Serbian Danish salesman in Denmark

See also
 Malkovich
 Malkoçoğlu 

Croatian surnames
Serbian surnames